The 1962 European Cup Winners' Cup Final was a football match contested between Atlético Madrid of Spain and the defending champions ACF Fiorentina of Italy. The final at Hampden Park, Glasgow finished 1–1. Madrid won 3–0 in the replay at Neckarstadion in Stuttgart. The replay was staged almost four months after the playing of the original game at Hampden Park on the same day as the first leg of the preliminary-round games for the 1962–63 European Cup Winners' Cup campaign. This was the second European Cup Winners' Cup final and the first to be played as a one-off match following the two-legged tie held the previous year.

Route to the final

Match

Details

Replay

See also
ACF Fiorentina in European football
Atlético Madrid in European football

External links
UEFA Cup Winners' Cup results at Rec.Sport.Soccer Statistics Foundation
1962 European Cup Winners' Cup Final at UEFA.com
UEFA Cup Winners' Cup results at Linguasport.com
Report at Eurocups-uefa.ru (Atlético de Madrid-Fiorentina 1-1)
Report at Eurocups-uefa.ru (Atlético de Madrid-Fiorentina 3-0)

3
Cup Winners' Cup Final 1962
Cup Winners' Cup Final 1962
Cup Winners' Cup Final 1962
Cup Winners' Cup Final 1962
1962
Cup
Euro
European Cup Winners' Cup Final
European Cup Winners' Cup Final
European Cup Winners' Cup Final, 1962
European Cup Winners' Cup Final, 1962
European Cup Winners' Cup Final, 1962
Sports competitions in Stuttgart
Football in North Rhine-Westphalia
20th century in Stuttgart
European Cup Winners' Cup Final, 1962